Brigadier A. K. Ocran was a Ghanaian military personnel and a former Chief of Army Staff of the Ghana Army. He served as Chief of Army Staff from February 1966 – August 1966.

References

Ghanaian military personnel
Chiefs of Army Staff (Ghana)